The 1st parallel south is a circle of latitude that is 1 degree (69.2 miles/111.36 kilometers)south of the Earth's equatorial plane. It crosses the Atlantic Ocean, Africa, the Indian Ocean, Southeast Asia, Australasia, the Pacific Ocean and South America.

The parallel defines most of the border between Uganda and Tanzania, and a very short section of the border between Kenya and Tanzania.

Around the world
Starting at the Prime Meridian and heading eastwards, the parallel 1° south passes through:

{| class="wikitable plainrowheaders"
! scope="col" width="110" | Co-ordinates
! scope="col" | Country, territory or sea
! scope="col" | Notes
|-
| style="background:#b0e0e6;" | 
! scope="row" style="background:#b0e0e6;" | Atlantic Ocean
| style="background:#b0e0e6;" |
|-
| 
! scope="row" | Gabon
|
|-
| 
! scope="row" | Republic of the Congo
|
|-
| 
! scope="row" | Democratic Republic of the Congo
|
|-
| 
! scope="row" | Uganda
|
|-
| 
! scope="row" | Uganda / Tanzania border
| Mostly in Lake Victoria
|-
| 
! scope="row" | Kenya / Tanzania border
| A short section of the border (about ), entirely within Lake Victoria
|-
| 
! scope="row" | Kenya
|-
| 
! scope="row" | Somalia
|
|-
| style="background:#b0e0e6;" | 
! scope="row" style="background:#b0e0e6;" | Indian Ocean
| style="background:#b0e0e6;" | Passing just south of Addu Atoll, Maldives
|-
| 
! scope="row" | Indonesia
| Island of Siberut
|-
| style="background:#b0e0e6;" | 
! scope="row" style="background:#b0e0e6;" | Mentawai Strait
| style="background:#b0e0e6;" |
|-
| 
! scope="row" | Indonesia
| Island of Sumatra - passing just south of Padang
|-
| style="background:#b0e0e6;" | 
! scope="row" style="background:#b0e0e6;" | Karimata Strait
| style="background:#b0e0e6;" |
|-
| 
! scope="row" | Indonesia
| Islands of Maya Karimata and BorneoWest KalimantanCentral KalimantanEast KalimantanFuture capital of Indonesia
|-
| style="background:#b0e0e6;" | 
! scope="row" style="background:#b0e0e6;" | Makassar Strait
| style="background:#b0e0e6;" |
|-
| 
! scope="row" | Indonesia
| Island of Sulawesi
|-
| style="background:#b0e0e6;" | 
! scope="row" style="background:#b0e0e6;" | Gulf of Tomini
| style="background:#b0e0e6;" |
|-
| 
! scope="row" | Indonesia
| Island of Sulawesi
|-
| style="background:#b0e0e6;" | 
! scope="row" style="background:#b0e0e6;" | Banda Sea
| style="background:#b0e0e6;" |
|-
| 
! scope="row" | Indonesia
| Island of Sulawesi
|-
| style="background:#b0e0e6;" | 
! scope="row" style="background:#b0e0e6;" | Molucca Sea
| style="background:#b0e0e6;" |
|-
| 
! scope="row" | Indonesia
| Island of Damar
|-
| style="background:#b0e0e6;" | 
! scope="row" style="background:#b0e0e6;" | Halmahera Sea
| style="background:#b0e0e6;" |
|-
| 
! scope="row" | Indonesia
| Islands of Salawati and New Guinea
|-
| style="background:#b0e0e6;" | 
! scope="row" style="background:#b0e0e6;" | Cenderawasih Bay
| style="background:#b0e0e6;" |
|-
| 
! scope="row" | Indonesia
| Island of Numfor
|-
| style="background:#b0e0e6;" | 
! scope="row" style="background:#b0e0e6;" | Cenderawasih Bay
| style="background:#b0e0e6;" |
|-
| 
! scope="row" | Indonesia
| Island of Biak
|-valign="top"
| style="background:#b0e0e6;" | 
! scope="row" style="background:#b0e0e6;" | Pacific Ocean
| style="background:#b0e0e6;" | Passing just north of the atolls of Pelleluhu and Heina, Papua New Guinea Passing just south of the Kaniet Islands, Papua New Guinea Passing just south of Banaba Island, Kiribati Passing between the atolls of Nonouti and Tabiteuea, Kiribati
|-
| 
! scope="row" | Ecuador
| Island of Isabela
|-
| style="background:#b0e0e6;" | 
! scope="row" style="background:#b0e0e6;" | Pacific Ocean
| style="background:#b0e0e6;" | Passing just south of the island of San Cristóbal, Ecuador
|-
| 
! scope="row" | Ecuador
| Passing just south of Manta
|-
| 
! scope="row" | Peru
|
|-
| 
! scope="row" | Colombia
|
|-valign="top"
| 
! scope="row" | Brazil
| Amazonas Roraima Amazonas Pará Amapá Pará - islands of Grande do Gurupá and Marajó Pará - passing just north of Belém Maranhão
|-
| style="background:#b0e0e6;" | 
! scope="row" style="background:#b0e0e6;" | Atlantic Ocean
| style="background:#b0e0e6;" |
|-
|}

See also
Equator
2nd parallel south

References

s01
Kenya–Tanzania border
Tanzania–Uganda border